Cornhill Insurance plc v Improvement Services Ltd [1986] 1 WLR 114 is a UK insolvency law case concerning the presentation of a winding up petition.

Case
Improvement Services Ltd claimed money under an insurance policy covering damage by fire to their building from their insurers, Cornhill Insurance plc (now part of Allianz after a takeover in 1986). £65000 was paid out already under the insurance policy. The solicitors of Improvement Services Ltd agreed with the loss adjusters at Cornhill that £1,154 was owed still: for some damage to plaster and damage to an injection machine lance. But Cornhill was not paying up. The solicitors repeated demands. They were not heard. So they went to the Chancery Court and presented a petition to wind up the company on the ground that it was insolvent under the Insolvency Act 1986 ss 122(f) and 123(1)(a). Straight away Cornhill Insurance claimed that Improvement Services was engaged in frivolous, vexatious litigation and applied for an injunction to restrain the winding up petition. It brought to the court its accounts, showing how much money it had. It was granted an interim injunction, but the matter still needed to be given a full hearing on continuing the injunction.

Judgment
Harman J refused the continuing injunction on the substantive hearing holding that the defendants were entitled to present a petition.

Cornhill Insurance's debt was paid very sharply after this decision.

See also
Mann v Goldstein [1968] 1 WLR 1091

Notes

References
Editorial, 'Winding up petition against rich company which does not pay undisputed debt' [1986] Journal of Business Law 80

United Kingdom insolvency case law
High Court of Justice cases
1985 in case law
1985 in British law